Hepatovirus is a genus of viruses. The genus has nine species, including Hepatovirus A, which is the causative agent of hepatitis A.

Taxonomy
These species are recognized:
 Hepatovirus A
 Hepatovirus B
 Hepatovirus C
 Hepatovirus D
 Hepatovirus E
 Hepatovirus F
 Hepatovirus G
 Hepatovirus H
 Hepatovirus I

References

Picornaviridae
Virus genera